Plesiobaena is an extinct genus of turtle which existed in the Belly River Formation, Canada during the late Cretaceous period (Campanian age). It was first named by Lawrence Lambe in 1902 and the type species is Plesiobaena antiqua.

References

Baenidae
Prehistoric turtle genera
Late Cretaceous turtles of North America
Hell Creek fauna
Laramie Formation
Fossil taxa described in 1902
Taxa named by Lawrence Lambe